The 2018–19 Kategoria e Parë was the 71st official season of the Albanian football second division since its establishment. The season began on 9 September 2018 and ended on 25 May 2019. There were 20 teams competing this season, split in 2 groups, each with 10 teams. The top 5 teams from each group qualified to the promotion round, while the last teams qualified to the relegation round. The 2 winners of the qualification round gained promotion to the 2019–20 Kategoria Superiore, and played the division's final against each other. Bylis and Vllaznia were promoted to the 2019–20 Kategoria Superiore. Tomori and Vora were relegated to the 2019−20 Kategoria e Dytë. Bylis won their fourth Kategoria e Parë title on 23 May 2019 after beating Vllaznia in the final match.

Changes from last season

Team changes

From Kategoria e Parë
Promoted to Kategoria Superiore:
 Kastrioti
 Tirana

Relegated to Kategoria e Dytë:
 Naftëtari
 Shkumbini
 Tërbuni
 Vllaznia B

To Kategoria e Parë
Relegated from Kategoria Superiore:
 Lushnja
 Vllaznia

Promoted from Kategoria e Dytë:
 Elbasani
 Oriku
 Veleçiku
 Vora

Locations

Stadia by capacity and locations

Group A

Group B

First phase

Group A

Group B

Second phase

Promotion round

Group A

Group B

Relegation round

Group A

Group B

Final

Relegation play-offs

Extra play−off match

An extra play−off match was played between the losers of the regular play−offs to replace the vacant spot left by Kamza, who was relegated from the Kategoria Superiore to the Kategoria e Dytë by federation decision.

References

2018-19
2
2018–19 in European second tier association football leagues